Never Too Young To Rock is a 1975 British musical comedy movie directed by Dennis Abey and stars Peter Denyer and Freddie Jones and features various music artists popular at the time of release such as The Glitter Band, The Rubettes, Mud, Scott Fitzgerald, Slik and Bob Kerr's Whoopee Band.

The movie revolves around a premise that rock music has been banned from television and our two heroes scour the country in their detector van for bands to perform at a concert aided and hindered by a likely assortment of people. The film was moderately successful at the time as was the soundtrack released by GTO Records.

Cast
 Peter Denyer - Hero
 Freddie Jones - Mr.Rockbottom
 Sheila Steafel - Cafe Proprietress
 Joe Lynch - Russian Soldier
 John Clive - Bandsman Milligan
 Peter Noone - Army Captain
 Bob Kerr's Whoopee Band -Themselves
 Joe Dunne - Mr Merlin
 Scott Fitzgerald - Himself
 The Glitter Band - Themselves
 Sally James - Herself
 Robert Longden - Man
 Mud - Themselves
 Nosher Powell - Football Fan
 Peter Powell - Himself
 The Rubettes - Themselves
 Midge Ure and Slik - Themselves (uncredited)

Soundtrack

A1 – Scott Fitzgerald -	Never Too Young To Rock	
A2 – The Rubettes - Sugar Baby Love	
A3 – The Glitter Band - Let's Get Together Again	
A4 – The Silver Band - Something Old, Something New	
A5 – Slik - The Boogiest Band In Town
A6 – The Glitter Band - Shout It Out	
A7 – The Rubettes - Tonight	

B1 – The Glitter Band - Angel Face	
B2 – Bob Kerr's Whoopee Band - 5,000 Year Old Rock
B3 – The Rubettes - Juke Box Jive	
B4 – The Glitter Band - Just For You	
B5 – The Silver Band - Quadrangular March	
B6 – The Cast - Never Too Young To Rock

Three tracks by Mud (Dyna-Mite, Tiger Feet, The Cat Crept In) are heard in the movie but don't appear on the soundtrack. The soundtrack album peaked in the UK chart at number 30 in August 1975.

References

1975 films
1970s English-language films